Griswold's ameiva (Pholidoscelis griswoldi) is a species of lizard in the family Teiidae. The species is endemic to Antigua and Barbuda, where it is found on both islands. It is also known as the Antiguan ameiva or the Antiguan ground lizard.

Etymology
The specific name, griswoldi, is in honor of Dr. Donald W. Griswold who was Director of the Rockefeller West Indian Hookworm Commission.

Geographic range
P. griswoldi is common on Barbuda, and more common on the offshore islands of Antigua than on that main island.

Description
Populations of P. griswoldi on Barbuda are dark brown with irregular, cream-colored splotches. The flanks are pale blue-green and tan, with black spots and markings. The ventral surface is gray with black on its chest.

See also
Antigua and Barbuda
Antiguan racer

References

Further reading

Barbour T (1916). "Additional Notes on West Indian Reptiles and Amphibians". Proc. Biol. Soc. Washington 29: 215-220. (Ameiva griswoldi, new species, pp. 216–217).
Goicoehea, Noemí; Frost, Darrel R.; De la Riva, Ignacio; Pellegrino, Katia C. M.; Sites, Jack Jr; Rodrigues, Miguel T.; Padial, José M. (2016). "Molecular systematics of teioid lizards (Teioidea/Gymnophthalmoidea: Squamata) based on the analysis of 48 loci under tree-alignment and similarity-alignment". Cladistics 32 (6): 624-671. (Pholidoscelis griswoldi, new combination).

Schwartz A, Thomas R (1975). A Check-list of West Indian Amphibians and Reptiles. Carnegie Museum of Natural History Special Publication No. 1. Pittsburgh, Pennsylvania: Carnegie Museum of Natural History. 216 pp. (Ameiva griswoldi, p. 59).

Pholidoscelis
Endemic fauna of Antigua and Barbuda
Lizards of the Caribbean
Reptiles of Antigua and Barbuda
Near threatened fauna of North America
Reptiles described in 1916
Taxa named by Thomas Barbour